Marshall Koehn (born August 29, 1992) is a former American football placekicker. He was signed by the Miami Dolphins as an undrafted free agent in 2016. He played college football at Iowa.

College career 
Koehn attended the University of Iowa from 2012–2015. After a collegiate career in which he made 28 of 36 field goals, he finished with a field goal percentage of 77.8%.  He helped Iowa beat Pittsburgh 27–24 by kicking a 57-yard field goal as time expired on September 19, 2015.

Professional career

Miami Dolphins
In May 2016, the Miami Dolphins signed Koehn as an undrafted free agent. On August 27, 2016, he was waived by the Dolphins.

Minnesota Vikings
On January 3, 2017, the Minnesota Vikings signed Koehn. On September 2, 2017, he was waived by the Vikings.

Cincinnati Bengals
On November 4, 2017, Koehn signed with the Cincinnati Bengals after an injury to Randy Bullock. The next day, he kicked an extra point in the second quarter of a 23-7 loss to the Jacksonville Jaguars. He was released on November 11, 2017 after Bullock was deemed healthy.

New York Giants
On January 1, 2018, Koehn signed a reserve/future contract with the New York Giants. He was waived on September 1, 2018. He was re-signed to the practice squad on October 9, 2018, only to be released three days later. He was re-signed to the practice squad on November 23, 2018, but was released three days later.

References

External links
Minnesota Vikings bio

1992 births
Living people
Players of American football from Iowa
American football placekickers
Iowa Hawkeyes football players
Miami Dolphins players
Minnesota Vikings players
Cincinnati Bengals players
New York Giants players